Jens Skålberg (born July 2, 1985, in Munkfors) is a Swedish ice hockey defenceman.  He is currently playing for TPS in the Finnish SM-liiga. The 2007/08 season will be his first in the Elitserien. Skålberg's name is spelled without an "h", which is a common mistake people make. He will be playing for TPS in the SM-liiga in 2009/2010.

External links 
 

1985 births
Färjestad BK players
Living people
Swedish ice hockey defencemen